The Conmhaícne Angaile (the 'Conmhaícne descended from Angaile') were an early people of Ireland. Their tuath comprised the territory of Annaly, now County Longford.

Origin
The Conmhaícne or Conmaícne were a people of early Ireland, perhaps related to the Laigin, who dispersed to various parts of Ireland. They settled in Connacht and Longford, giving their name to several Conmaícne territories.  Other branches of the Conmhaícne were located in County Galway, Roscommon, Mayo, and Leitrim.

Territory

Their territory was bounded by native Irish forests in places, by the River Shannon and Conmaícne of Maigh Rein to the east, Breifne O'Reilly to the north, and Leinster to the east.

Taoiseach
The chief Conmaícne family were the Ó Fearghail, who descended from the great-grandson of Angaile.

Diocese
The Diocese of the Conmaícne (or Ardagh)  was  established in 1111 as the see for east Connacht. Fourteen years later, at the Synod of Kells-Mellifont its area was reduced to the territory of the Conmaícne in County Longford and south County Leitrim.

See also
Annaly

References

Notes

Sources

  A Chorographical Description of West or H-Iar Connaught written A.D. 1684 by Roderic O'Flaherty ESQ with notes and Illustrations by, James Hardiman M.R.I.A., Irish Archaeological Society, 1846.

History of County Longford
Historical ethnic groups of Europe
Ethnic groups in Ireland
Gaelic-Irish nations and dynasties
Conmaicne Angaile